Popular Democrat Party may refer to:

 Popular Democratic Party (Puerto Rico)
 Popular Democrats (Sweden)
 Popular Democrats, Italy
 Democrat Party (Thailand)